Power Book II: Ghost is an American drama television series created by Courtney A. Kemp that premiered on September 6, 2020 on Starz. The series is both a sequel and spin-off to Power.

In December 2021, the series was renewed for a third season which premiered on March 17, 2023. In January 2023, ahead of the third season premiere, the series was renewed for a fourth season.

Premise
Ghost follows Tariq navigating his new life, in which his desire to shed his father's legacy comes up against the mounting pressure to save his family. Along the way, Tariq gets entangled in the affairs of the cutthroat Tejada family, adding further complications as he tries to balance his drug operations with his education, love life, family affairs, and mounting pressure from Cooper Saxe.

Cast and characters

Main

 Michael Rainey Jr. as Tariq St. Patrick, the son of James "Ghost" St. Patrick and Tasha Green-St. Patrick, who is slowly following in his father's footsteps as a drug dealer
 Shane Johnson as Cooper Saxe, the attorney protecting Tariq, despite failed attempts to catch Ghost, Tasha, Tommy and Tariq.
 Gianni Paolo as Brayden Weston, Tariq's best friend and business partner from Choate, as well as current roommate at Stansfield
 Melanie Liburd as Caridad "Carrie" Milgram, one of Tariq's professors who had a secret relationship with Zeke (seasons 1-2)
 Lovell Adams-Gray as Dru Tejada, the artistic middle child of Monet and Lorenzo and brother of Cane and Diana who is secretly gay
 Daniel Bellomy as Ezekiel "Zeke" Cross, Monet's hidden son with Mecca and Carrie's new love interest (seasons 1-2)
 Quincy Tyler Bernstine as Tameika Washington, an attorney formerly affiliated with Saxe (season 1; guest season 2)
 Paige Hurd as Lauren Baldwin, Tariq's former classmate and ex-girlfriend who is in witness protection.
 Woody McClain as Lorenzo "Cane" Tejada Jr., the ruthless eldest child of Monet and Lorenzo, brother of Dru and Diana and Tariq’s main enemy.
 Justin Marcel McManus as Jabari Reynolds, Carrie's ex-boyfriend and Tariq's professor (season 1; guest season 2)
 Method Man as Davis MacLean, Tasha and later Tariq and the Tejada's lawyer who looks to win at all costs
 LaToya Tonodeo as Diana Tejada, the youngest child of Monet and Lorenzo and sister of Dru and Cane who is also in the drug business but has aspirations of going to school and Tariq's love interest. 
 Mary J. Blige as Monet Stewart Tejada, queenpin and second-in-command of the Tejada drug cartel, mother of Cane, Dru, Diana, and secretly Zeke
 Naturi Naughton as Tasha St. Patrick, Tariq's mother and Ghost's wife (season 1; guest season 2)
 Daniel Sunjata as Dante "Mecca" Spears, Cane's new business associate, a former associate of Felipe Lobos and Monet's old flame, the father of their secret son, Zeke (season 2)
 Paton Ashbrook as Jenny Sullivan, an attorney working on the Jabari Reynolds case, who's sleeping with Saxe (season 2-present; guest season 1)
 Berto Colon as Lorenzo Tejada Sr., Monet's husband, the leader of the Tejada operation and father to Cane, Dru and Diana (season 2-present; recurring season 1)
 Alix Lapri as Effie Morales, Tariq's drug dealer ex-girlfriend at Choate and his new business partner, the two rekindled their relationship in the process (season 2-present; recurring season 1)
 Larenz Tate as Councilman Rashad Tate, Ghost's former political rival and now, an ethics professor at Stansfield (season 2-present; recurring season 1)
 Keesha Sharp as Professor Harper Benett, Tariq's new American Psyche professor (season 3)
 David Walton as Lucas Weston, Brayden's uncle and the CEO of the family company (season 3)
 Monique Curnen as NYPD Sargent Blanca Rodriguez, an NYPD Sargent who investigated Ghost and Tariq in the past (season 3; recurring season 1, guest season 2)
 Moriah Brown as Keke Travis, an employee at the Weston's company and Brayden's new colleague (season 3),

Recurring
 Kathleen Garrett as Judge Nina Larkin, the judge presiding over Tasha St. Patrick's case (season 1)
 Debbi Morgan as Estelle Green, Tasha's mother and Tariq and Yas' grandmother
 Paris Morgan as Yasmine St. Patrick, Tariq's little sister and Ghost and Tasha's daughter
 Victor Garber as Simon Stern, Ghost's former business partner
 Mark Feuerstein as Steven Ott, the representative of the political party Ghost was part of
 Sung Kang as John Mak, an attorney formerly involved in the Lobos-Ghost investigation (season 1)
 Sherri Saum as Paula Matarazzo, top investigator and right hand of Davis (season 1; guest season 2)
 Shalim Ortiz as Danilo Ramirez, an NYPD officer stationed in the Tejadas' backyard of Queens, NY, and Monet's ex-boyfriend before Cane killed him (season 1)
 Lightskin Keisha as BruShandria Carmichael, Tariq's classmate
 Brandi Denise Boyd as Epiphany Turner, a stripper single mom, who worked together with Tasha (season 1)
 Cory Jeacoma as Trace Weston, Brayden's entitled brother
 Marcus Anderson Jr. as Lil' Guap, the Tejada's former partner, before Tariq, who frequently worked with Cane before being killed by Dru (seasons 1-2)
 Brittani Tucker as Chelle, Rel's ex-girlfriend now Cane's girlfriend
 Andrea Lee Christensen as Riley Saxe-Merchant, Cooper's niece and Brayden's new love interest (season 1)
 Bradley Gibson as Everett Neal, a member of Zeke's basketball team and Dru's new love interest
 Geoffrey Owens, as Daniel Warren, a lawyer Ghost trusted with the handling of his will and assets
 Michael J. Ferguson as Francis "2-Bit" Johnson, a convicted felon formerly associated with Andre Coleman and Tommy Egan (seasons 1, 3)
 Laz Alonso as Samuel Santana, a detective investigating the death of the GTG assassin on the faculty grounds (season 1)
 Jimmie Saito as Chef Eric Kamura, Mecca's right-hand man and chef (season 2)
 Jeff Hephner as Kevin Whitman, the lead detective investigating Jabari's murder (season 2-present)
 Lahmard Tate as Kamaal Tate, Rashad's brother who is a police officer (season 2)
 Frank Whaley as Judge Kenneth Lucas, the judge presiding over Tariq's case (season 2)
 Zephani Idoko as Stephanie, Davis MacLean's Stylist (season 2)
 Petey McGee as Salim Ashe Freeman (season 3)
 Gbenga Akinnagbe as Ron Samuel Jenkins aka RSJ (season 3)
 Kyle Vincent Terry as Obi (season 3)
 Caroline Chikezie as Noma (season 3)
 Lauren Vélez as Evelyn Castillo, Frank's wife, who shows up after her husband has gone missing (guest season 2; season 3)
 Greg Serano as Agent Juan Julio Medina (season 3)

Guest stars
 David Zayas as Uncle Frank Castillo, a relative of the Tejadas who tried to set them up (season 1)
 Glynn Turman as Gabriel, uncle to Ghost (season 1)
 Elizabeth Rodriguez as Paz Valdes, Angela Valdes' sister (season 1)
 Jeff Auer as Robert Weston, the patriarch of the Weston family
 Angel Reda as Nicole Weston, wife to Robert and mother to Brayden, Trace and Becca
 Donshea Hopkins as Raina St. Patrick, Tariq's twin sister
 Luenell Campbell as Ms. Richards, Spanky's mother (season 1)
 Jackie Long as Rico Barnes, the man who provides the drugs for the Tejadas to distribute (season 1)
 Joseph Sikora as Tommy Egan, Ghost's best friend, Tariq's godfather and surrogate uncle and Cash's surrogate father (season 1)
 Denim Roberson as Cash Grant, LaKeisha Grant's son and Tommy's surrogate son (season 1)
 Redman as Theo Rollins, Davis' older brother who is in prison (season 2)
 50 Cent as Kanan Stark, Ghost's old friend and Tariq's mentor of sort, whom he got killed and has nightmares of (season 2)
 Alani "La La" Anthony as LaKeisha Grant, Tommy's ex and Tasha's former best friend, who was murdered by her in order to protect Tariq (season 2)
 Marcus Callender as Raymond "Ray Ray" Walker, the corrupt cop who murdered Raina St. Patrick and became Tariq's first victim (season 2)
 Jerry Ferrara as Joseph Proctor, Ghost and Tommy's former lawyer who was murdered by the latter, after Tariq allowed him access to his penthouse (season 2)
 Emeka Okafor as himself and a basketball trainer for Zeke (season 2)

Episodes

Series overview

Season 1 (2020–21)

Season 2 (2021–22)

Season 3 (2023)

Production

Development
On July 26, 2019, Starz announced the straight-to-series order with the news that Mary J. Blige would star. On February 9, 2020, Starz announced the premise of the series. On September 22, 2020, Starz renewed the series for a second season. On December 7, 2021, Starz renewed the series for a third season with Brett Mahoney taking over as the showrunner. On January 30, 2023, ahead of the third season premiere, Starz renewed the series for a fourth season.

Casting
Mary J. Blige was cast on July 26, 2019, with the initial news. On January 14, 2020, Method Man was cast in a main role. The remainder of the main cast was entirely announced on February 9, 2020. On July 21, 2020, Sherri Saum was cast for the series. Two days later, Shalim Ortiz was cast in a recurring role. On February 24, Daniel Sunjata was cast as a new series regular for the second season. On April 27, 2021, Redman joined the cast in a guest starring role for the second season. On June 21, 2021, Paton Ashbrook, Berto Colon, and Alix Lapri were promoted to series regulars while Lahmard Tate joined the cast in a recurring role, reprising his role as Kamaal Tate from the sixth season of Power. On October 1, 2021, Frank Whaley joined the cast in a recurring role for the second season. In January 2022, Keesha Sharp, David Walton, Monique Curnen, and Moriah Brown were cast as series regulars while Petey McGee joined the cast in a recurring role for the third season. In March 2022, Gbenga Akinnagbe, Kyle Vincent Terry, and Caroline Chikezie were cast in recurring roles for the third season. Upon the fourth season renewal announcement, Michael Ealy joined the cast as a new series regular for the fourth season.

Release
The series premiered on September 6, 2020 on Starz. The series' official trailer was released on August 4, 2020. The second season premiered on November 21, 2021. The third season premiered on March 17, 2023.

Reception

Season 1

Season 2

Accolades

References

External links
 
 

2020s American drama television series
2020s American black television series
2020 American television series debuts
Television series by G-Unit Films and Television Inc.
American television spin-offs
English-language television shows
Starz original programming
Television series by CBS Studios
Television series by Lionsgate Television